Jean-Louis Richards is a French professional football manager. In 2010, he coached the Saint Martin national football team together with David Baltase.

References

Year of birth missing (living people)
Living people
French football managers
Expatriate football managers in the Collectivity of Saint Martin
Saint Martin national football team managers
Place of birth missing (living people)